The 1867 Waimea by-election was a by-election held on 28 June 1867 in the  electorate during the 3rd New Zealand Parliament.

The by-election was caused by the resignation of the incumbent MP Arthur Robert Oliver on 9 January 1867.

The by-election was won by Edward Baigent.

Results

References

Waimea 1867
1867 elections in New Zealand
Politics of the Marlborough Region
Politics of the Nelson Region
June 1867 events